Main Street Plaza may refer to:

 Main Street Complex, once known as Main Street Plaza 1000
 Prete Main Street Plaza, Round Rock, Texas, U.S.